Azerbaijan Museum is the major archaeological and historical museum in Tabriz, in the northwest part of Iran (East Azerbaijan Province). It was established in April 1958. The museum consists of three major halls, a side yard, office rooms and a library. It mostly contains objects discovered from excavations in Iranian Azerbaijan, also some artworks and sculptures of artists. Its library contains more than 2500 books, both handwritten and printed, about history, archaeology, art and Iranian culture. Apart from National Museum of Iran in Tehran, Azerbaijan Museum has the largest collection belonging to different periods of Iran's history.

The Azerbaijan museum is the first and oldest museum in the northwestern part of the country, and the exhibits that you can find inside of it include objects from different archaeological sites throughout the country and cover the full chronological span of its history, making the museum one of the most important in Iran and a truly national one.

Galleries
The museum has three galleries. The first gallery bears the oldest remains from 5th millennium BC until Sassanian dynasty (212-656 AD). The museum's monuments include goddesses, Rhytons, two skeletons (male and female) and a carved slab of marble known as Bism Allah-Stone. 
The second gallery consists of two parts: one for Islamic archeology and another part for coins and seals. Part one involves pottery dated from the 10th to the 19th centuries. The coins of this gallery (part two), began with the Achamenid dynasty and end in the Qajar dynasty. The displayed seals and stamps date from the third millennium BC to Islamic eras.

The third gallery includes some sculptures made by Ahad Hosseini. They are made of plaster and represent the sculptor's own image about the fate of mankind in the 20th century.

In the yard of museum some stone figurines, statues, rams and inscriptions are kept.

Theft
On May 7, 2013, five silver plates belonging to the Sasanid time were stolen from Azerbaijan museum. In November 2013, East Azerbaijan police arrested the thieves but they couldn't retrieve the stolen items.

Location
Azerbaijan Museum is located next to Khaqani Park and Tabriz Blue mosque in central part of Tabriz.

Photo gallery

See also
 Iron Age museum
 Amir Nezam House
 Constitutional House of Tabriz
 Museum of Ostad Bohtouni
 Pottery museum
 National Museum of Iran
 Safir Office Machines Museum

References

1958 establishments in Iran
Museums established in 1958
Museums in Tabriz
Archaeological museums